Tour of Iran 2014 is 28th round of Tour of Iran (Azerbaijan) which took place between June 17 till June 22, 2014 in Iranian Azerbaijan. The tour had 6 stage.

Stages of the Tour

Final standing

References

Tour of Azerbaijan (Iran)